The following lists events that happened during 1798 in Australia.

Leaders
Monarch - George III
Governor of New South Wales – John Hunter
Lieutenant-Governor of Norfolk Island – Philip Gidley King
 Inspector of Public Works – Richard Atkins

Events
 2 January – George Bass sights Wilsons Promontory
 26 January – The koala and lyrebird observed by John Price on an expedition led by John Wilson 
 12 February – Matthew Flinders explores the Furneaux Islands
 25 February – John Hunter names Bass Strait in honour of George Bass
 14 May – HMS Nautilus arrives in Sydney, carrying missionaries from the London Missionary Society 
 1 October – Sydney's first church St Philip's is destroyed by fire
 7 October – George Bass and Matthew Flinders leave Sydney to explore Van Diemen's Land on the Norfolk
7 October – St Phillip's Church founded in Sydney, completed in 1809
8 November – Nauru discovered by John Fearn
9 December – Bass and Flinders confirm the existence of the Bass Strait
22 December – Norfolk enters the Derwent River
25 December – George Bass climbs Mount Wellington

References

 
Years of the 18th century in Australia